San Tsuen is a village in Tsuen Wan District, Hong Kong.

Administration
San Tsuen is a recognized village under the New Territories Small House Policy.

References

External links
 Delineation of area of existing village San Tsuen (Tsuen Wan) for election of resident representative (2019 to 2022)

Villages in Tsuen Wan District, Hong Kong